Lewis Jonathan Wertheim (born 1970 in Bloomington, Indiana) is a sports journalist and author. He has been a full-time staff member for Sports Illustrated since 1996  and is currently the Executive Editor. He has covered tennis, the NBA, sports business and mixed martial arts. He is also a contributing correspondent for 60 Minutes on CBS and analyst for the Tennis Channel at the four Majors. Wertheim is the author of ten books, including Strokes of Genius: Federer, Nadal, and the Greatest Match Ever Played, which gives a stroke by stroke analysis of the 2008 Men's Singles Wimbledon final between Roger Federer and Rafael Nadal and is a co-author (along with Toby Moskowitz) of the New York Times bestseller Scorecasting: The Hidden Influences Behind How Sports Are Played and Games Are Won, a wide-ranging statistical analysis of common misconceptions in American sports.

He lives in New York City with his wife Ellie and their two children.

He has an undergraduate degree from Yale University and a law degree from the University of Pennsylvania.

He is Jewish.

References

60 Minutes correspondents
American Jews
American people of Scottish descent
American sports journalists
Living people
People from Bloomington, Indiana
Tennis writers
Yale University alumni
1970 births